Portogruaro-Caorle is a railway station serving the town of Portogruaro and the seaside resort of Caorle, in the region of Veneto, northern Italy. The station is located on the Venice–Trieste railway, Treviso-Portogruaro railway and Casarsa–Portogruaro railway. The train services are operated by Trenitalia.

Modernisation
In 2011, as part of the restructuring of the services in the Veneto Region two new platforms were opened on the south side of the station for trains terminating from the Venice direction. In June 2013 a new bus station opened at the front of the station.

Train services
The station is served by the following service(s):

High speed services (Frecciarossa) Turin - Milan - Verona - Padua - Venice - Trieste
Intercity services Rome - Florence - Bologna - Padua - Venice - Trieste
Express services (Regionale Veloce) Venice - Portogruaro - Cervignano del Friuli - Trieste
Express services (Regionale Veloce) Verona - Padua - Venice - Latisana
Local services (Treno regionale) Venice - Portogruaro
Local services (Treno regionale) Treviso - Portogruaro
Local services (Treno regionale) Portogruaro - Casarsa della Delizia

Bus services
Regular buses operate on the routes to Treviso and Casarsa supplementing the train service.

See also

History of rail transport in Italy
List of railway stations in Veneto
Rail transport in Italy
Railway stations in Italy

References

 This article is based upon a translation of the Italian language version as of January 2016.

External links

Railway stations in Veneto